Fiction is an American literary magazine founded in 1972 by Mark Jay Mirsky, Donald Barthelme, and Max Frisch.  It is published by the City College of New York. This is not the same as the French science fiction magazine Fiction, published from 1953-1990.

In its early years, Fiction was published in tabloid format and featured experimental work by such writers as John Barth, Jerome Charyn, Italo Calvino, Ronald Sukenick, Steve Katz, Russell Banks, Samuel Beckett, and J. G. Ballard. It later took the form of a more traditional paperback literary magazine, publishing short works by Reinaldo Arenas, Isaac Babel, Donald Barthelme, Jackson Bliss, Mei Chin, Julio Cortázar, Marguerite Duras, Natalia Ginzburg, Clarice Lispector, Robie Macauley, Robert Musil, Joyce Carol Oates, Manuel Puig, and John Yau.

Though the magazine ostensibly focuses on publishing fiction, as its name implies, it has recently also featured excerpts from Robert Musil's diaries and letters, as well as various writings with an autobiographical slant.

See also
List of literary magazines

References

External links
 Fiction Magazine website

Literary magazines published in the United States
Biannual magazines published in the United States
Fiction magazines
Magazines established in 1972
Magazines published in New York City